Pterocarya tonkinensis (越南枫杨, yue nan feng yang) is a tree in the Juglandaceae family that grows up to 30 meters in height, endemic to Laos, Vietnam and southern Yunnan, China.

References

 Bull. Soc. Dendrol. France 70: 67 1929.
 The Plant List

tonkinensis
Trees of China
Trees of Laos
Trees of Vietnam
Plants described in 1898